This is a complete list of Members of Parliament elected at the 1924 general election, held on 29 October.

By-elections
See the list of United Kingdom by-elections.

Sources

Data from Oliver & Boyd's Edinburgh Almanac, 1927.

See also
UK general election, 1924
List of parliaments of the United Kingdom
:Category:UK MPs 1924–1929

1924
1924 United Kingdom general election
 List
UK MPs